During the 20th Canadian Parliament, women continued to sit as members of both the House of Commons and the Senate. Nineteen women ran for seats in the Canadian House of Commons in the 1945 federal election. Gladys Strum was elected in the Qu'Appelle riding as a Co-operative Commonwealth Federation member; she was the fourth woman to sit in the House of Commons and the first woman to serve as president of a Canadian political party. Cairine Wilson and Iva Campbell Fallis continued to sit as members of the Senate.

Party Standings

Members of the House of Commons

Senators

References 

Lists of women politicians in Canada